Asymmetric competition refers to forms of business competition where firms are considered competitors in some markets or contexts but not in others. In such cases a firm may choose to allocate competitive resources and marketing actions among its competitors out of proportion to their market share. Asymmetric competition can be visualized using techniques such as multidimensional scaling and perceptual mapping.

Forms of asymmetric competition
Firm A may compete with B in some markets but not others.
Firm A competes with B over certain attributes (such as reliability and design) but not over others (price).
Firm A considers B as a competitor but B does not consider A to be a competitor.
Firm A does not consider B to be a competitor, however, consumers see A's products as competing with B's products.

See also
Competition
Coopetition
Product differentiation
Non-price competition
Information asymmetry
Multimarket contact
Size-asymmetric competition

References

Bibliography
Carpenter, Gregory S., Lee G. Cooper, Dominique M. Hanssens, and David F. Midgley. "Modeling asymmetric competition." Marketing Science 7, no. 4 (1988): 393-412.
Scitovsky, Tibor. "The benefits of asymmetric markets." The Journal of Economic Perspectives 4, no. 1 (1990): 135-148.
DeSarbo, Wayne S., Rajdeep Grewal, and Jerry Wind. "Who competes with whom? A demand‐based perspective for identifying and representing asymmetric competition." Strategic Management Journal 27, no. 2 (2006): 101-129.
Etzion, Hila, and Edieal J. Pinker. "Asymmetric competition in B2B spot markets." Production and Operations Management 17, no. 2 (2008): 150-161.
Ringel, Daniel M., and Bernd Skiera. "Visualizing asymmetric competition among more than 1,000 products using big search data." Marketing Science 35, no. 3 (2016): 511-534.

Marketing research
Marketing strategy